Poco is the second album by American country rock band Poco. This is the band's first album to feature Timothy B. Schmit who replaced Randy Meisner on electric bass. The Messina-penned "You Better Think Twice" became a signature song for the band. A copy of this album hangs in the Poco exhibit in the Country Music Hall of Fame in Nashville along with the jacket Rusty Young wears on the back cover. The album was dedicated to David Geffen who "picked up the pieces".

Reception

In his Allmusic review, music critic Bruce Eder called the album "These songs represent the group's blend of country and rock at its finest and brightest, with the happy harmonies of "Hurry Up" and "Keep on Believin'" totally irresistible... The knock was "too country for rock, too rock for country," but in fact, they were just ahead of their time, a tough spot to be in the world of popular entertainment." In his review, Robert Christgau wrote; "The most overrated underrated group in America. All of CSNY's preciosity with none of the inspiration, all of bluegrass's ramifications with none of its roots. In short, the perfect commentary on the vacuity of competence."

Track listing

Charts

Personnel
Poco
 Jim Messina – guitar, vocals
 Richie Furay – guitar, vocals
 Rusty Young – steel guitar, guitar, dobro, vocals
 Timothy B. Schmit – bass guitar, vocals
 George Grantham – drums, vocals
With:
 Bobby Doyle – piano
 Larry Knechtel – piano
 Milt Holland – percussion

Production
 Jim Messina - producer
 Terry Dunavan, Alex Kazanegras - engineer
 Gary Burden - art direction, design
 Henry Diltz - photography
 Morris Ovsey - cover drawing

References 

Poco albums
1970 albums
Albums produced by Jim Messina (musician)
Epic Records albums